Sahl ibn Saʿd al-Sāʿidī was one of the prominent Sahaba, or direct companions of the Islamic prophet Muhammad, a member of the Ansar and an early Muslim scholar. He died in 91 AH. He was born as a Muslim, he narrated 188 hadeth's. He married Aisha bint Khuzayma and had a son named Abbas ibn Sahl.

See also

References

710 deaths
Year of birth unknown
Companions of the Prophet